Final Fight 3, released in Japan as , is a side-scrolling beat 'em up by Capcom originally released for the Super Nintendo Entertainment System in 1995. It is the second sequel to Final Fight released for the Super NES, following Final Fight 2, and like its predecessor, it was produced by Capcom's consumer division with no preceding arcade version released.

The game features the return of the protagonist Guy along with Haggar and also introduces new characters Lucia and Dean. The game's plot takes them through their efforts to rid Metro City of the new Skull Cross gang. Final Fight 3 introduced new moves, as well as branching paths during gameplay and multiple endings. Also available is the option to fight alongside a CPU-controlled partner. However, most critics felt these changes did too little in the way of expanding and improving upon the original Final Fight, and the game was released to little fanfare.

The next Final Fight game released, Final Fight Revenge, eschewed the side-scrolling beat'em up gameplay in favor of a one-on-one 3D fighting game format.

Plot
Following the annihilation of the Mad Gear Gang, a new criminal group named the Skull Cross Gang emerges as the new dominant criminal organization in Metro City. When Guy returns to Metro City from his martial arts training and reunites with his old friend Mike Haggar, the Mayor of Metro City, the two are suddenly alerted that the Skull Cross Gang has started a riot in the downtown area of the city. Joined by Lucia, a detective in the Metro City Police's Special Crimes Unit, and Dean, a street fighter whose family was murdered by the Skull Cross Gang, Guy and Haggar must once again save Metro City from its newest menace.

Gameplay

The player has a choice between four characters: Guy and Haggar from the original Final Fight return, along with new heroes Lucia and Dean. As in the previous Final Fight games, each character has their own set of moves, techniques and abilities unique to their character. Like in Final Fight 2, the game can be played alone or with a second player, along with an additional game mode that allows a single player be accompanied by a CPU-controlled partner.

The player has many new abilities which were not available in the previous Final Fight games. The player can now dash and perform dashing attacks or dashing jump attacks like in the previous Capcom beat-em-up Captain Commando. The player can also grab enemies from behind  and perform holding and throwing attacks, as well as move while keeping the direction the player is facing locked.

The player also has access to command-based special techniques similar to Street Fighter, including a Super Move. Much like the Super Combos featured in Super Street Fighter II Turbo, the player has a Super Move gauge which fills up as the player performs their regular attacks against enemies. When the gauge is full, the player will have access to a powerful Super Move, which will consume the entire gauge. If the Super gauge remains full for a certain period and the Super move is not used, then the gauge will be emptied automatically.

Like in the previous Final Fight games, the player has access to weapons, health-restoring food and other bonus point items, which are stored inside breakable drums. Each character in Final Fight 3 specializes in a specific weapon and if the player picks up their character's preferred weapon, then they will have access to a unique combo attack exclusive to the character (for example, Guy specializes in using nunchaku).

There are a total of six stages in the game, each with their unique boss character. The stages in the game feature multiple paths that changes the areas the player will visit, as well as the enemies and bosses they encounter. The game's ending changes depending on the selected character, the path taken to reach the end of the game, and the difficulty setting.

Reception

GamePro gave the game a mixed review, summarizing that "Although Final Fight 3 has more characters and moves than its precursors, the gameplay quickly feels routine." They approved of the addition of Lucia but felt Dean's moves were "sluggish and awkward" and that the bosses were little more than oversized regular enemies. While they praised the graphics and the branching stages, they felt the repetitiveness of the gameplay outweighed these. The four reviewers of Electronic Gaming Monthly similarly felt that despite the improved graphics and new features, the game felt like simply "more of the same" with overly repetitive gameplay. A reviewer for Next Generation too felt that the additions were not enough to make the game a significant step forward from the original, and remarked, "It's not dull, but it's not all that exciting either."

In 2018, Complex rated the game #58 in their The Best Super Nintendo Games of All Time writing: "The third and final game in the Final Fight trilogy is the best out of the litter. And oh, yeah, Guy returned. So you know it was going down." In 2023, Time Extension included the game on their top 25 "Best Beat 'Em Ups of All Time" list. They called it the best game in the series.

Legacy
The first stages background music, "For Metro City", is used for the Hyper Street Fighter Alpha secret game featured in Street Fighter Alpha Anthology as Guy's theme music in Classic Mode. Lucia later appeared as a playable character in Street Fighter V.

References

External links
Final Fight Tough at the Wii Virtual Console site 

1995 video games
Capcom beat 'em ups
Final Fight games
Video games about ninja
Side-scrolling beat 'em ups
Super Nintendo Entertainment System games
Video games about police officers
Video games developed in Japan
Video games set in the United States
Video games featuring female protagonists
Virtual Console games
Virtual Console games for Wii U
Video game sequels